South Coast Tasmania runs from the South East Cape to the South West Cape of Tasmania. South Coast Tasmania is sometimes conflated with the South West Tasmania wilderness region.

The significant features between South West Cape and South East Cape include:-

 Cox Bight

 Louisa Bay

 New River Lagoon

 South Cape

See also
South Coast Track

External links
 Usage of location name for photographs of coastal features

Further reading
 Gee, H and Fenton, J. (Eds) (1978)  The South West Book - A Tasmanian Wilderness Melbourne, Australian Conservation Foundation. 
 Lines, William J. Patriots : defending Australia's natural heritage  St. Lucia, Qld. : University of Queensland Press, 2006.  
 Neilson, D. (1975)  South West Tasmania - A land of the Wild. Adelaide. Rigby. 

Map
 (1997) South coast walks [cartographic material] : track coverage Moonlight Ridge Wilson Bight, Scotts Peak - Melaleuca - Cockle Creek [Tasmania] Land Information Services, Department of Environment and Land Management, in co-operation with Parks and Wildlife Service Hobart : The Department. (Maps show walking tracks in Southwest National Park, and environs. Relief shown by contours, hill shading and spot heights. Includes track descriptions and tourist information.  Panel title.  Includes locality map indexing 1:100 000 and 1:25 000 topographic map sheets).

South West Tasmania
South coast of Tasmania